Vexillum acromiale is a species of small sea snail, marine gastropod mollusk in the family Costellariidae, the ribbed miters.

Description
The length of the shell attains 11 mm; its diameter 4 mm.

(Original description) The ovate-fusiform shell is rather thin and light. Its colour is pale buff. The shell contains six whorls, including a smooth protoconch of 1½ whorl. The spire is gradate. 

Sculpture : perpendicular ribs widely spaced, about seventeen on the body whorl, diminishing and alternating n ascent from whorl to whorl, knotted at the shoulder and fading at the base. The spirals occur as six prominent cords on the snout, above which a dozen threads become fainter as they ascend,
traverse the interstices but not the ribs. About six of these ascend the spire. The aperture is pyriform. The outer lip is simple. The columella shows with four well developed, spaced, oblique plaits.

Distribution
This marine species is endemic to Australia and occurs off New South Wales, Queensland, South Australia, Victoria, Western Australia)

References

 Cernohorsky, W.O. 1970. Systematics of the families Mitridae & Volutomitridae (Mollusca: Gastropoda). Bulletin of the Auckland Institute and Museum. Auckland, New Zealand 8: 1-190 
 Cernohorsky, W.O. 1980. Revision of the Australian and New Zealand Tertiary and Recent temperate species of the family Costellariidae (Mollusca: Gastropoda). Records of the Auckland Institute and Museum 16: 109-169
 Wilson, B. 1994. Australian marine shells. Prosobranch gastropods. Kallaroo, WA : Odyssey Publishing Vol. 2 370 pp. 
 Salisbury, R.A. 1999. Costellariidae of the World, Pt. 1. Of Sea and Shore 22(3): 124-136 
 Turner H. 2001. Katalog der Familie Costellariidae Macdonald, 1860. Conchbooks. 1-100 page(s): 14

acromiale
Gastropods described in 1915
Gastropods of Australia